Darois is a commune in the Côte-d'Or department in eastern France.

Population

Economy
Dyn'Aéro has its headquarters in Darois.

See also

Communes of the Côte-d'Or department

References

Communes of Côte-d'Or